The 1950 Ulster Trophy was a non-championship Formula One motor race held on 12 August 1950 at the Dundrod Circuit, in Northern Ireland.

Classification

Race

References

Ulster Trophy
Ulster Trophy